Gwacheon Line is a metropolitan rail line operated by Korail in Gyeonggi Province, South Korea. All trains is operated as a through service into Seoul Metro's Line 4 and Ansan Line on the other end.

From January 15, 1993 to March 31, 1994, the Seoul Metropolitan Subway Line 1 operated like the Ansan Line, and since the opening of all sections on April 1, 1994, it has been operated as a part of the Metropolitan Subway Line 4.

Stations

See also
Subways in South Korea
Seoul Subway Line 4

References

As part of the first new town development in the early 1990s, the Gwacheon Line was built under the leadership of the Korea Railroad Administration (currently Korea Railroad Corporation) for the purpose of connecting Sanbon New Town and Pyeongchon New Town with Gwacheon City and Seoul Metropolitan City. From January 15, 1993 to March 31, 1994, the Seoul Metropolitan Subway Line 1 operated like the Ansan Line, and since the opening of all sections on April 1, 1994, it has been operated as a part of the Metropolitan Subway Line 4.

External links
서울교통공사

Seoul Metropolitan Subway lines
Railway lines in South Korea
Railway lines opened in 1993
Transport in Gyeonggi Province

동인천역 파크푸르지오